The 2000 thatlook.com 300 was the 18th stock car race of the 2000 NASCAR Winston Cup Series and the eighth iteration of the event. The race was held on Sunday, July 9, 2000, in Loudon, New Hampshire, at New Hampshire International Speedway, a  permanent, oval-shaped, low-banked racetrack. The race was shortened from its scheduled 300 laps to 273 due to inclement weather. At race's end, Tony Stewart, driving for Joe Gibbs Racing, would complete a dominant performance when the race was stopped to win his sixth career NASCAR Winston Cup Series win and his third of the season. To fill out the podium, Joe Nemechek of Andy Petree Racing and Mark Martin of Roush Racing would finish second and third, respectively.

The race was marred by the death of Kenny Irwin Jr., who died due to a stuck throttle in the race's Friday practice session. The accident was eerily similar to another fatal crash at the same track when NASCAR Busch Series driver Adam Petty died in the 2000 Busch 200 two months before the race. After Irwin's death, NASCAR would face criticism for its lack of kill switches and safety in general.

Background 
New Hampshire International Speedway is a 1.058-mile (1.703 km) oval speedway located in Loudon, New Hampshire which has hosted NASCAR racing annually since the early 1990s, as well as an IndyCar weekend and the oldest motorcycle race in North America, the Loudon Classic. Nicknamed "The Magic Mile", the speedway is often converted into a 1.6-mile (2.6 km) road course, which includes much of the oval. The track was originally the site of Bryar Motorsports Park before being purchased and redeveloped by Bob Bahre. The track is currently one of eight major NASCAR tracks owned and operated by Speedway Motorsports.

Entry list 

 (R) denotes rookie driver.

*Withdrew due to a practice crash, killing Irwin.

Practice

First practice 
The first practice session was held on Friday, July 7, at 11:15 AM EST. The session would last for two hours and five minutes.

Death of Kenny Irwin Jr. 
During the first practice session, Team SABCO driver Kenny Irwin Jr. would suffer a stuck throttle on his first lap, sending Irwin into the outside wall. Brett Bodine, who was behind Irwin at the time, reported in an interview with CNN that the car hit the Turn 3 outside wall, then proceeded to roll onto the driver's side, riding the wall. Eventually, after coming to a stop, Irwin's car flipped over to its roof. Irwin likely died instantly of a basilar skull fracture.

While the cause of the crash is widely believed to be a stuck throttle on Irwin's car, the local police department, led by police chief Robert Fiske, report that they could not hold a proper investigation due to both NASCAR and New Hampshire International Raceway president Bob Bahre continuing the scheduled pre-race activities. Fiske reported that if NASCAR had called the police earlier, they could have found out the exact cause, saying "I think there would be a good possibility, particularly because of the witnesses that we would have been able to gain. If they heard the acceleration, for instance, or saw something through the cockpit there, any number of things. Even the tracks that were left on the track. Was it straight into the wall? Did he start to turn? God only knows. I haven't a clue."

After the crash, NASCAR was criticized for its lack of urgency in safety, with another similar incident happening two months before at the same track with Adam Petty. Within the months after Irwin's crash, NASCAR and some race teams would experiment with creating new kill switches and head harnesses to avoid a crash like Irwin and Petty's. However, NASCAR would still be criticized for its lack of urgency even after the implemented kill switch, with the deaths of Tony Roper, Dale Earnhardt, and Blaise Alexander, all caused by basilar skull fractures finally convincing NASCAR to implement stricter safety measures.

Second practice 
The second practice session was held on Saturday, July 8, at 9:00 AM EST. The session would last for one hour and 30 minutes.

Third and final practice 
The third and final practice session, sometimes referred to as Happy Hour, was held on Saturday, July 8, at 1:30 PM EST. The session would last for one hour.

Qualifying 
Qualifying was split into two rounds. The first round was held on Friday, July 7, at 2:30 PM EST. Each driver would have two laps to set a fastest time; the fastest of the two would count as their official qualifying lap. During the first round, the top 25 drivers in the round would be guaranteed a starting spot in the race. If a driver was not able to guarantee a spot in the first round, they had the option to scrub their time from the first round and try and run a faster lap time in a second round qualifying run, held on Saturday, July 8, at 11:00 AM EST. As with the first round, each driver would have two laps to set a fastest time; the fastest of the two would count as their official qualifying lap. Positions 26-36 would be decided on time, while positions 37-43 would be based on provisionals. Six spots are awarded by the use of provisionals based on owner's points. The seventh is awarded to a past champion who has not otherwise qualified for the race. If no past champion needs the provisional, the next team in the owner points will be awarded a provisional.

Dave Marcis was the only driver to fail to qualify.

Full qualifying results

Race results

References 

2000 NASCAR Winston Cup Series
NASCAR races at New Hampshire Motor Speedway
July 2000 sports events in the United States
2000 in sports in New Hampshire